Justice Burke may refer to:

 Adrian P. Burke (1904–2000), judge of the New York Court of Appeals
 Aedanus Burke (1743–1802), soldier, judge, and United States Representative from South Carolina
 Anne M. Burke (born 1944), Illinois Supreme Court Justice for the First Judicial District
 E. James Burke (born c. 1949), associate justice of the Wyoming Supreme Court
 Edmond W. Burke (1935–2020), associate justice of the Alaska Supreme Court
 Edward T. Burke (1870–1935), justice of the Supreme Court of North Dakota
 John Burke (North Dakota politician) (1859–1937), associate justice of the North Dakota Supreme Court
 Louis H. Burke (1905–1986), associate justice of the Supreme Court of California]
 Nicholas Charles Burke (1854–1923), associate justice of the Maryland Court of Appeals
 Thomas Burke (railroad builder) (1849–1925), American lawyer, railroad builder, and chief justice of the Supreme Court of the Washington Territory
 Thomas J. Burke (North Dakota judge) (1896–1966), associate justice of the North Dakota Supreme Court

See also
Judge Burke (disambiguation)